The following is a list of rivers of Mauritius.

Mainland
Rivière Cascade
Rivière Citrons
Rivière des Créoles
Rivière des Galets
Rivière des Lataniers
Grande Rivière Noire
Grande Rivière Nord-Ouest
Rivière du Poste
Rivière du Poste de Flacq
Rivière du Rempart
Rivière Saint-Denis
Rivière Savanne
Grande Rivière Sud-Est
Rivière Tamarin
Rivière Terre Rouge
Rivière du Tombeau
Rivière Rempart
Rivière la chaux
rivière patates

External links 
 
 

 
Rivers
Mauritius